Aksengir (Aqseñgır), previously Raz'yezd Sem'desyat, is a village in Almaty Region of south-eastern Kazakhstan. The village lies on the road from Boralday to Ushkonyr.

References

External links
Tageo.com

Populated places in Almaty Region